Syllepte albitorquata is a moth in the family Crambidae. It was described by Tams in 1924. It is found in Thailand.

References

Moths described in 1924
albitorquata
Moths of Asia